Alberto T. Adela Berting (born 1934) is a Filipino boxer. He competed in the 1956 Summer Olympics.

1956 Olympic results
Alberto Adela lost in his first round match (round of 32) to Song Soon-Chun of South Korea on points.  The Korean eventually finished second (silver medalist) in the bantamweight division.

References

External links
 

1934 births
Living people
Boxers at the 1956 Summer Olympics
Filipino male boxers
Olympic boxers of the Philippines
Bantamweight boxers